Shahana Ashar is a Pakistani politician who is a member-elect of the Provincial Assembly of Sindh.

Political career

She was elected to the Provincial Assembly of Sindh as a candidate of Muttahida Qaumi Movement (MQM) on a reserved seat for women in 2018 Pakistani general election.

References

Living people
21st-century Pakistani women politicians
Muttahida Qaumi Movement MPAs (Sindh)
Year of birth missing (living people)